Pantylus (from  , 'all' and  , 'knob') is an extinct lepospondyl amphibian from the Permian period of North America.

Pantylus was probably a largely terrestrial animal, judging from its well-built legs. It had numerous blunt teeth, and probably chased after invertebrate prey.

References

External links  
  Skull cast

Recumbirostrans
Cisuralian amphibians of North America
Taxa named by Edward Drinker Cope
Fossil taxa described in 1881